Malik Alaudin Khan was the son of  Raja Nahar Khan and the jagirdar of Tijara. He was a Khanzada Rajput. In 1402, his father Nahar Khan was killed in an ambush for embracing Islam by his Hindu relative Raja Thakur Jhamo Singh of Kishangarh. Alaudin Khan avenged his father by killing his maternal relative Jhamo Singh in the same year. Malik Alaudin Khan ruled Tijara and Alwar on behalf of the Mewat State. He renewed the construction of the Alwar fort.

References 

 https://archive.org/stream/gazetteerofulwur00powliala#page/40/mode/2up
 
 

Mewat
Indian Muslims
Year of birth unknown
People from Tijara
Year of death unknown